7th CDG Awards
February 19, 2005

Period/Fantasy: 
 Lemony Snicket's A Series of Unfortunate Events 

Contemporary: 
 The Life Aquatic with Steve Zissou 
The 7th Costume Designers Guild Awards, given on 19 February 2005, honored the best costume designs in film and television for 2004. Winners highlighted in bold.

Winners

Film
 Fantasy or Period Film:
  Lemony Snicket's A Series of Unfortunate Events - Colleen Atwood 
 The Aviator - Sandy Powell
 De-Lovely - Janty Yates
 The Phantom of the Opera - Alexandra Byrne
 Ray - Sharen Davis

 Contemporary Film:
  The Life Aquatic with Steve Zissou - Milena Canonero 
 Alfie - Beatrix Aruna Pasztor
 Eternal Sunshine of the Spotless Mind - Melissa Toth
 Kill Bill: Volume 2 - Catherine Marie Thomas
 Ocean's Twelve - Milena Canonero

 Career Achievement Award:
 Anthea Sylbert

Television
 Contemporary Series:
  Sex and the City - Patricia Field 
 Desperate Housewives - Catherine Adair (for episodes 3-12)
 Nip/Tuck - Lou Eyrich
 Six Feet Under - Jill M. Ohanneson
 The Sopranos - Juliet Polcsa

 Fantasy or Period Series:
  The Life and Death of Peter Sellers - Jill Taylor 
 Cold Case - Patia Prouty
 Deadwood - Katherine Jane Bryant
 Iron Jawed Angels - Caroline Harris
 The Lion in Winter - Consolata Boyle

 Career Achievement Award:
 Robert Fletcher

Costume Designers Guild Awards
2004 film awards
2004 guild awards
2004 television awards
2004 in fashion
2005 in American cinema
2005 in American television